"Send Me Your Love" is a song by American singer-songwriter and actress Taryn Manning. It was written by Ivan Corraliza, Ilsey Juber, Michael Linney, Manning and its producers electronic music duo Sultan + Ned Shepard. The song released as a non-album single on August 21, 2012 by Citrusonic Stereophonic. It peaked at number-one on the Dance Club Songs chart.

Track list
Single feat. Sultan & Ned Shepard
 "Send Me Your Love" (feat. Sultan, Ned Shepard) [Edit] – 4:10

Single feat. Sultan & Ned Shepard Extended Version
 "Send Me Your Love" (feat, Sultan, Ned Shepard) [Original] – 6:09

Single feat. Valetto
 "Send Me Your Love" (Radio Mix) – 3:50

Single feat. Valetto extended version
 "Send Me Your Love" (Extended Club Mix) – 6:21

Remixes Pt. 1
 "Send Me Your Love" (R3hab Remix) – 5:45
 "Send Me Your Love" (Dave Audé Club) – 8:26
 "Send Me Your Love" (Dave Audé Dub) – 6:30
 "Send Me Your Love" (Dave Audé Mixshow) – 6:19
 "Send Me Your Love" (Dave Audé Radio Mix) – 3:35
 "Send Me Your Love" (Fred Falke Remix) – 7:35
 "Send Me Your Love" (Fred Falke Instrumental) – 7:35
 "Send Me Your Love" (Eddie Amador's Mochico Tech Remix) – 7:44

Remixes Pt. 2
 "Send Me Your Love" (Linney & ILL Factor OG Extended Mix) – 6:40
 "Send Me Your Love" (Linney & ILL Factor OG Edit) – 4:45
 "Send Me Your Love" (Rich Morel's Hot Sauce Club Mix) – 7:07
 "Send Me Your Love" (Rich Morel's Radio Edit) – 4:05
 "Send Me Your Love" (Hamel & Jeremus Remix) – 5:22
 "Send Me Your Love" (Hamel & Jeremus Dub) – 5:22
 "Send Me Your Love" (Automatic Panic Anthem Remix) – 6:28
 "Send Me Your Love" (Eddie Amador Remix) – 7:10

KDrew Remix Single
 "Send Me Your Love" (KDrew Remix) – 4:54

Chart performance

Year-end charts

See also
 List of number-one dance singles of 2012 (U.S.)

References

2012 singles
2012 songs
Dance-pop songs
Electronic dance music songs
House music songs